Cheong may refer to:

 Cheong (food), various sweetened food in the form of syrups, marmalades, and fruit preserves
 Cheong mountain fortress, one of the listed Historic Sites of South Korea

Surnames
 Chung (Korean name), a Korean surname
 Jeong (surname), Korean surname written 
 Chang (surname), Chinese surname written 
 Jiang (surname), Chinese surname written  and